Epitaciolândia is a municipality located in the southeast of state of Acre. Its population is 18,696 inhabitants  and its area is 1,659 km². It is the southernmost municipality in Acre.

The municipality contains part of the  Chico Mendes Extractive Reserve, a sustainable use environmental unit created in 1990.

References

Municipalities in Acre (state)
Populated places established in 1993